is a Japanese footballer who plays for YSCC Yokohama.

Club statistics
Updated to 23 February 2018.

References

External links

Profile at YSCC Yokohama

1987 births
Living people
People from Fujisawa, Kanagawa
Hosei University alumni
Association football people from Kanagawa Prefecture
Japanese footballers
J2 League players
J3 League players
Japan Football League players
YSCC Yokohama players
Gainare Tottori players
Zweigen Kanazawa players
Thespakusatsu Gunma players
Association football forwards